This is a list of European colonial administrators responsible for the territory of French West Africa, an area equivalent to modern-day Mauritania, Mali, Niger, Senegal, Guinea, Ivory Coast, Burkina Faso, Benin and Togo.

List

(Dates in italics indicate de facto continuation of office)

See also
French West Africa
Ivory Coast
Benin
French Dahomey
Mali
French Sudan
Guinea
Mauritania
Niger
Senegal
Burkina Faso
French Upper Volta
Togo
French Togoland
Lists of office-holders
List of French possessions and colonies

External links

History of Ivory Coast
French Dahomey
Political history of Mali
History of Guinea
History of Mauritania
History of Niger
History of Senegal
20th century in Burkina Faso
West Africa
Colonial heads
Colonial heads
Colonial heads
Colonial heads
Colonial heads
Colonial heads
Colonial heads
Colonial administrators of French West Africa
Colonial administrators of French West Africa